Thomas William Glover (born 24 December 1997) is an Australian professional footballer who plays as a goalkeeper for A-League side Melbourne City.

Early life
Born in Sydney, Glover attended Menai High School in the Sutherland Shire and previously played for the Sutherland Sharks youth teams. He was also a keen basketball player at school. In 2014, Glover moved to London to join Tottenham Hotspur.

Playing career

Tottenham Hotspur
Glover joined Tottenham's Academy full-time in the summer of 2014, he started 16 times for the Under-18s in the 2014/15 season and impressively produced a string of penalty saves throughout the season. He stepped up to make his Under-21s debut in a 2–1 defeat at Liverpool in October, 2014, and played twice in Tottenham's run to the FA Youth Cup semi-finals.

In 2015–16, he made 11 league appearances for the Under-21s, in addition to four appearances in the Premier League Under-21 International Cup. As a result of many impressive performances he signed a new contract with the Club in December, 2015, and was also part of the first team squad on matchdays on a handful of occasions, serving as back-up to Hugo Lloris and Michel Vorm.

Central Coast Mariners
On 26 July 2017, Glover joined Central Coast Mariners on a season-long loan. He then went on to make his senior debut for the Mariners on 7 October 2017 in round one of the 2017–18 A-League season, a loss to Newcastle Jets in the F3 Derby.

Glover had a trial spell with Scottish Premiership club Hibernian in January 2019.

Helsingborg
In April 2019, Glover was loaned to Helsingborg for a few months.

At the end of the 2018–19 season Glover was released from his contract.

Melbourne City
Glover returned to Australia and was signed by Melbourne City. He made his debut in a 4–0 win over Newcastle Jets in December 2019.

Glover made his first A-League Grand Final in 2020 where City lost 1–0 to Sydney FC in extra time. At the start of September 2020, Glover won the July/August Nominee for Young Footballer of the Year.

On December 17 2022 at the Melbourne Derby Glover was struck in the head by a metal bucket after Melbourne Victory supporters entered the field of play as part of a planned protest against the APL decision to sell the A-League Grand Final to the Government of New South Wales. Fans of Melbourne City and Melbourne Victory had planned to stage a walkout at the 20 minute mark of the game, but invaded the pitch after Glover threw a flare back towards Victory supporters.

Olympics 
Glover qualified for the Tokyo 2020 Olympics. He was part of the Olyroos Olympic squad. The team beat Argentina in their first group match but were unable to win another match. They were therefore not in medal contention.

Career statistics

Club

Notes

Honours
Melbourne City
 A-League Premiership: 2020–21
 A-League Championship: 2021

References

External links 

1997 births
Living people
Australian soccer players
Association football goalkeepers
Australia under-20 international soccer players
Central Coast Mariners FC players
Tottenham Hotspur F.C. players
Helsingborgs IF players
Melbourne City FC players
A-League Men players
Australia youth international soccer players
Australian expatriate soccer players
Australian expatriate sportspeople in England
Expatriate footballers in England
Footballers at the 2020 Summer Olympics
Olympic soccer players of Australia